Vira Lozinsky (born 1974) is an Israeli-Moldovan musician and Yiddish language singer.

Biography
Vira Lozinsky was born in 1974 in Bălți, Moldova (Bessarabia) to a family of Jewish artists. As a child, Vira studied music and played the violin at the city music school. She participated in the local Yiddish theater led by her father Mikhoel Felsenbaum. She was exposed at an early age to the cultures and musical styles of the many ethnic groups living in Moldova: Moldovans, Romanians, Jews, Roma, Russians and others.  Her repertoire includes new material written mainly by her father, Mikhoel Felsenbaum, as well as classical Yiddish folk songs, Romanian folk songs translated to Yiddish, songs of classical and modern Yiddish poets.
After immigrating to Israel at age 16, she pursued Yiddish and Musicology studies in Bar Ilan University, and vocal studies in the Rimon School of Jazz and Contemporary Music in Ramat HaSharon. For several years was a student of Nechama Lifshitz's Yiddish song workshop. 

Vira Lozinsky has toured several countries and participated in klezmer events in Israel, Europe, and the Americas.

Discography

Album 
 Wunderweg (Wondrous Way) (2011)
 Vayte Shtern (Distant Stars) (2007)

Participation 
 A Jewish Celebration , (Putumayo World Music, 2012) 
 Postcards (Beyond the Pale, 2009) (winner of two Canadian Folk Music Awards for 2010

Awards
  Grand Prize: International Jewish Music Competition in Amsterdam - 2012

  Mira Rafalowicz Prize (best Yiddish): International Jewish Music Competition in Amsterdam - 2012
 Independent Music Awards nominee 2012  World Traditional album category

 Just Plain Folks Music Awards 2009 winner - for the song Malokhim Lid
 Vira Lozinsky has been nominated for the 7th Annual Independent Music Awards / Best World Music album (2008) World Music Central
 Nester Mayner composed by Yuri Povolotsky, with the lyrics by Michael Felsenbaum won the Jury Prize at the 2022 Bubbe Awards for "Best New Original Yiddish Song"

Musical Reviews
 Review by Keith Wolzinger

References

External links
 Official Site
 Vira Lozinsky on MySpace music
 Ashkenaz Festival 2008 Toronto
 Jewcy Media Group
 Canadian Jewish News:  "Montreal Chamber Music Festival 2014"
 JEWISH CULTURE

1974 births
Living people
Soviet emigrants to Israel
Yiddish-language singers
Jewish Israeli musicians
Moldovan Jews
21st-century Israeli women singers
Israeli people of Moldovan-Jewish descent
Israeli folk singers
People from Bălți
Klezmer musicians
Bar-Ilan University alumni
Jewish women singers